Geoffrey Sidebottom (26 December 1936 – 3 November 2008) was an English professional footballer who played as a goalkeeper.

Career
Sidebottom joined Wolverhampton Wanderers from their Yorkshire-based nursery club Wath Wanderers in 1954. Due to the talent of Bert Williams and Malcolm Finlayson, he had to wait until 1 November 1958 to make his first team debut, in a 2–1 defeat to West Bromwich Albion.

He managed 35 appearances for Wolves, including playing in the 1960 Charity Shield, before moving to their Midlands neighbours Aston Villa in February 1961. He broke through to their starting XI and played in their 1961 League Cup triumph over Rotherham United.

After 88 games in total for Villa, he joined Scunthorpe United in January 1965 and was a near-ever present in the 1965-66 season for them before losing his spot to the emerging Ray Clemence.

He had a spell playing in America with the New York Generals during 1967-68 when signed by his former Scunthorpe manager Freddie Goodwin. He later followed Goodwin back to England to join Brighton and Hove Albion in January 1969 before retiring in 1971.

Sidebottom appeared on the US game show What's My Line! which aired on CBS on Sunday 11 June 1967.

He died on 3 November 2008, aged 71.

References

External links
Official Wolves site obituary

1936 births
2008 deaths
People from Mapplewell
English footballers
Association football goalkeepers
English Football League players
Wolverhampton Wanderers F.C. players
Aston Villa F.C. players
Scunthorpe United F.C. players
Brighton & Hove Albion F.C. players
New York Generals (NPSL) players
New York Generals players
National Professional Soccer League (1967) players
North American Soccer League (1968–1984) players
Sportspeople from Yorkshire
English expatriate sportspeople in the United States
Expatriate soccer players in the United States
English expatriate footballers